This is a complete list of seasons competed by the Saskatchewan Roughriders, a Canadian Football League team.  While the team was founded in 1910 (as the Regina Rugby Club), they did not join the CFL until it was founded in 1958.  Throughout their history, the Roughriders have won four Grey Cups since western teams were permitted to compete for the trophy in 1921.

References

Seasons